Old Country Road is an east–west highway in Nassau and Suffolk counties in New York, in the United States.

Old Country Road may also refer to:
County Route 58 (Suffolk County, New York), north of the hamlet of Riverhead
County Route 71 (Suffolk County, New York), along the south shore of Long Island near the hamlet of Westhampton